These are the albums that reached number one on the Billboard Top R&B/Hip-Hop Albums chart in 2002.

Chart history

See also
2002 in music
R&B number-one hits of 2002 (USA)

2002